Georgios Katsikogiannis  (born 5 September 1988) is a Greek professional footballer who plays as a defensive midfielder.

Career 
Born in Athens, Katsikogiannis signed his first professional contract with Olympiacos at the start of the 2007/08 season. He made his debut with Olympiacos F.C on 8 December 2007.

In September 2008, Olympiacos expanded his contract for 4 more years and loaned him to Levadiakos for 2 years. After only one-year spell with Levadiakos, Olympiacos terminated the loan and brought Katsikogiannis back to the squad for the 2009–2010 season.

As of February 2010,he is on loan to OFI Crete until the end of the season.

Honours 
Hellenic Super Cup: 2007

Greek Super League: 2008

Greek Cup: 2008

External links 
 
Profile at Onsports.gr

1988 births
Living people
Olympiacos F.C. players
Levadiakos F.C. players
OFI Crete F.C. players
Doxa Drama F.C. players
Kallithea F.C. players
Super League Greece players
Association football midfielders
Footballers from Athens
Greek footballers